Cornwall County Cricket Club was established in November 1894. The club has played minor counties cricket since 1897 and played List A cricket from 1970 to 2003, using a number of home grounds during that time. Their first minor counties fixture in 1897 was against Glamorgan, while their first List A match came 73 years later against the same opposition in the 1970 Gillette Cup. One first-class match has been held in the Duchy, when an England XI played the touring Australians in 1899. History was made in 2012, when England Women played India Women in a Women's One Day International at Boscawen Park in Truro, the first time an official international match had been played in Cornwall. The club is nomadic, as such it has no headquarters.

The seventeen grounds that Cornwall have used for home matches since 1897 are listed below, with statistics complete through to the end of the 2012 season.

Grounds

Map

List A
Below is a complete list of grounds used by Cornwall County Cricket Club when it was permitted to play List A matches. These grounds have also held Minor Counties Championship and MCCA Knockout Trophy matches.

Minor Counties
Below is a complete list of grounds used by the Cornwall County Cricket Club in Minor Counties Championship and MCCA Knockout Trophy matches.

Notes

References

Cornwall County Cricket Club
Cricket
Cricket grounds in Cornwall
Cornwall